Max Giorgio Choa Minghella (born 16 September 1985) is an English actor, film producer, director, and screenwriter. He is known for his roles in the films Syriana (2005), Art School Confidential (2006), Elvis and Anabelle (2007), The Social Network (2010), The Ides of March (2011), The Internship (2013), Horns (2013), and Spiral (2021), as well as his role as Nick Blaine in the television series The Handmaid's Tale (2017–present), which earned him a Primetime Emmy Award nomination in 2021.

Early life and education
Minghella was born in Hampstead, London, the son of director Anthony Minghella (1954–2008) and dancer and choreographer Carolyn Jane Choa. His father was born in Ryde, Isle of Wight, and was of Italian descent, and his mother was born in Hong Kong. 

While Minghella was growing up he spent time on his father's film sets. He has said that he has "fond memories" of them and that he felt "no pressure" from his father to succeed in the entertainment industry. He was educated at St Anthony's Preparatory School and University College School in Hampstead. He then attended Columbia University, which he considered his "first priority", and studied history, graduating in 2009. He was a resident of John Jay Hall during his studies at Columbia. He typically worked on films only during his summer breaks. He has said that he felt like "an English boy at an American school", that he kept to himself, and that most of his fellow students did not know that he was an actor.

Heritage
Minghella's father was born on the Isle of Wight, and was of Italian descent. His mother, who was from Hong Kong, is from a family of multiple heritage. His maternal grandfather George Choa was of three-quarters Chinese and one-quarter Jewish descent, and his maternal grandmother Maisie Nora (née Kotewall) was of Indian Parsi, English, Irish, Swedish and Chinese ancestry.

Sir Robert Kotewall is his great-grandfather. Olympic swimmer Robyn Lamsam is his second cousin through the Kotewalls.

Career
Minghella was inspired to become an actor during his young years, after seeing a production of the play This Is Our Youth in London's West End; he subsequently dropped out of the University College School to pursue an acting career, and attended the National Youth Theatre. He did not always want to become an actor. He said: "I thought it was sort of embarrassing to say you wanted to be an actor  it was, like, uncool. And growing up I was massively concerned with seeming cool. I thought up until about age 16 that I was going to be a music video director."

Minghella had an uncredited appearance as an extra in his father's film Cold Mountain. His first professional role was in Bee Season, playing the son of a dysfunctional Jewish American family. The film was released in November 2005 to mostly mixed reviews and low box office, grossing only $1 million in its limited release, although critics remarked that Minghella was "a talented young actor to watch, delivering a strong performance".

Minghella's other November 2005 role was the political thriller Syriana in which he played the son of George Clooney's CIA agent character. In 2006, he starred in the Daniel Clowes adaptation Art School Confidential, a comedy directed by Terry Zwigoff. He got the part after meeting Zwigoff when he visited the set of Bee Season. His film Elvis and Anabelle, a dark romantic drama in which he plays an undertaker's son, premiered at the South by Southwest film festival in 2007. He described it as "a really sweet film". He was to play Art Bechstein in the film version of writer Michael Chabon's novel The Mysteries of Pittsburgh, but dropped out of the project due to his university schedule.

The press reported in 2007 that Minghella was cast in Beeban Kidron's Hippie Hippie Shake, a film about writer Richard Neville set in 1960s London. In March 2008, it was announced that he would star in Alejandro Amenábar's second English language film, Agora. The film is set in 4th century Egypt and revolves around Hypatia of Alexandria. Later in 2008, Minghella played a pompous film director in How to Lose Friends & Alienate People, and was seen in a segment of the dark comedy Brief Interviews with Hideous Men.

In David Fincher's The Social Network, the 2010 film about the origins of Facebook, he plays Divya Narendra, one of the Harvard upperclassmen who sues Mark Zuckerberg for stealing the idea behind Facebook. In June 2010, Minghella was cast in the Russian science-fiction film The Darkest Hour, released in December 2011. He appeared in the ensemble dramedy 10 Years (2012). The following year, he had a supporting role as Graham Hawtrey in the comedy The Internship.

In November 2013, it was announced that Minghella would be playing Richie Castellano in the second season of the Fox sitcom The Mindy Project. In 2013, he appeared in the music video for "Shot at the Night" by The Killers.

Minghella has been playing the role of Nick Blaine, an Eye in the Republic of Gilead and the love interest of June Osborne, in the Hulu dystopian series The Handmaid's Tale since 2017. He was nominated for a Primetime Emmy Award for Outstanding Supporting Actor in a Drama Series for the role in 2021. 

Minghella made his directorial debut with 2018's Teen Spirit, a musical, from his own screenplay.

Minghella will next star in the 2022 film Babylon.
He currently lives in Los Angeles.

Filmography

Film

Television

Notes

References

External links
 

1985 births
Living people
British male actors of Chinese descent
English male film actors
English male television actors
21st-century English male actors
National Youth Theatre members
People educated at University College School
Columbia College (New York) alumni
People from Hampstead
English people of Italian descent
English people of Chinese descent
English people of Hong Kong descent
English people of Jewish descent 
English people of Irish descent
English people of Parsi descent
English people of Swedish descent